CHAK-TV was a small CBC Television/CBC North owned-and-operated station for the Northwest Territories community of Inuvik. The station was registered on May 16, 1968 to the Canadian Broadcasting Corporation to operate on channel 6, with an effective radiated power of 3,000 watts video and 300 watts audio. The antenna height (EHAAT) would be 394 feet. This station was part of the CBC's Frontier Coverage Package for northern communications.

CHAK-TV was also heard at 87.7 MHz on FM radios, though at a slightly lower volume than other FM stations - due to technical reasons.

History
The station began broadcasting on August 22, 1969, and was associated with CHAK radio. In 1974, the station placed a broadcast translator in Fort McPherson (CHAK-TV-1), on Channel 13, with an effective radiated power of 100 watts.

In 1985, some changes took place at CHAK-TV. July 3 saw a proposal to decrease power from 3,000 watts to 122 watts. During this time, the CRTC noted that CHAK-TV was originally licensed to serve both Inuvik, and nearby Aklavik, and to serve the town of Fort McPherson, via CHAK-TV-1. Since CHAK-TV-1 was being fed by satellite by this time, the CBC filed an application to place a new satellite-fed low-power transmitter at Aklavik (which would become CBEX-TV). This was approved by the CRTC on December 18. The CRTC saw that a reduction in power would not affect the station's coverage area in Inuvik, and noted that no changes would take effect until CBEX-TV was on the air. This was to ensure that Aklavik and area would not be deprived of CBC services.

On February 10, 1986, CBEX-TV in Aklavik took to the air on Channel 13, with an effective radiated power of 100 watts.

Due to budget cuts handed down on the CBC in April 2012, the CBC has announced several austerity measures to keep the corporation solvent and in operation; this included the closure of the CBC and Radio-Canada's remaining analog transmitters, including CHAK-TV and its rebroadcasters on July 31, 2012.

Transmitters
CHAK had 3 analog television rebroadcasters located in Fort McPherson, Tuktoyaktuk and Aklavik. None of CBC or Radio-Canada's television rebroadcasters were converted to digital.

See also
CBC North

References

External links
CBC North
 

HAK
Television channels and stations established in 1969
Television channels and stations disestablished in 2012
HAK
Inuvik
HAK